The 2020 Rallye Deutschland (also known as the ADAC Rallye Deutschland 2020) was a motor racing event for rally cars that was scheduled to be held over four days between 15 and 18 October 2020, but was cancelled due to the COVID-19 pandemic. It was set to mark the thirty-eighth running of Rallye Deutschland and planned to be the twelfth round of the 2020 World Rally Championship, World Rally Championship-2 and World Rally Championship-3. It was also planned to run as the final round of the 2020 Junior World Rally Championship. The 2020 event was scheduled to be based in Bostalsee in Saarland.

Ott Tänak and Martin Järveoja were the defending rally winners. The team they drove for in 2019, Toyota Gazoo Racing WRT, were the defending manufacturers' winners. Jan Kopecký and Pavel Dresler were the defending winners in the World Rally Championship-2 category. In the World Rally Championship-3 category, Fabian Kreim and Tobias Braun were the reigning rally winners.

Notes

References

External links
   
 2020 Rallye Deutschland at ewrc-results.com
 The official website of the World Rally Championship

2020 in German motorsport
Deutschland
2020
Deutschland